Capital punishment in Connecticut formerly existed as an available sanction for a criminal defendant upon conviction for the commission of a capital offense. Since the 1976 United States Supreme Court decision in Gregg v. Georgia until Connecticut repealed capital punishment in 2012, Connecticut had only executed one person, Michael Bruce Ross in 2005. Initially, the 2012 law allowed executions to proceed for those still on death row and convicted under the previous law, but on August 13, 2015, the Connecticut Supreme Court ruled that applying the death penalty only for past cases was unconstitutional.

History
Between 1639 and 2005, Connecticut performed 126 executions. Twenty-four executions occurred in Connecticut Colony, prior to its statehood. The remaining 102 executions occurred after Connecticut's 1788 admission to the Union as the fifth state. Contrary to popular belief, Adonijah Bailey was not the oldest person ever to be executed in Connecticut, at age 79 in 1824; instead, he was tried and sentenced to death at age 80 in January 1825 for the murder of Jeremiah W. Pollock, and hanged himself on May 24, over two weeks before he was to be executed. The oldest person ever to be executed in Connecticut is Gershon Marx, who was hanged for murder at the age of 73, on May 18, 1905.

Modern era
After Furman v. Georgia, Connecticut reinstated the death penalty on January 10, 1973. Lethal injection became the method mandated to execute condemned prisoners, replacing the electric chair, which had not been used since Taborsky's execution in 1960.

Unlike most of the other states, the Governor of Connecticut cannot commute the death sentence imposed under State law or pardon a death row inmate. This is determined by the Board of Clemency, on which the Governor does not sit. The other states where the Board has sole authority are Georgia and Idaho.

Repeal
On May 22, 2009, the Connecticut General Assembly passed a bill that would abolish the death penalty, although it would not retroactively apply to the eleven current Connecticut death row inmates or those convicted of capital crimes committed before the repeal went into effect. The bill was vetoed by Governor Jodi Rell.

On April 11, 2012, the Connecticut House of Representatives voted to repeal capital punishment for future cases (leaving past death sentences in place). The Connecticut Senate had already voted for the bill, and on April 25 Governor Dannel Malloy signed the bill into law. That made Connecticut the 17th state in the US without the death penalty, and the fifth state to abolish capital punishment in five years. In 2015 the state Supreme Court ruled found that applying the death penalty only for past cases was unconstitutional, definitively ending the death penalty in Connecticut.

Cheshire murder case 
	
One notable death penalty case in Connecticut was the Cheshire home invasion murders. The two murderers, Steven Hayes and Joshua Komisarjevsky, were both sentenced to death for the crime, and were among the inmates who had their sentences reduced as result of the state supreme court ruling. Survivor Dr. Petit condemned the state's decision to abolish the death penalty and spare the two criminals.

Capital crimes
Murder with special circumstances, also called capital felony, was the only capital crime in Connecticut. These include any of the following:
Murder while the victim was acting within the scope of his duties, a police officer, Division of Criminal Justice inspector, state marshal exercising his statutory authority, judicial marshal performing his duties, constable performing law enforcement duties, special policeman, conservation or special conservation officer appointed by the environmental protection commissioner, Department of Correction (DOC) employee or service provider acting within the scope of his employment in a correctional facility and the perpetrator is an inmate, or firefighter
Murder committed by a defendant who is hired to commit the same for pecuniary gain or murder committed by one who is hired by the defendant to commit the same for pecuniary gain
Murder committed by one who has previously been convicted of intentional murder or of murder committed in the course of commission of a felony
Murder committed by one who was, at the time of commission of the murder, under sentence of life imprisonment
Murder by a kidnapper of a kidnapped person during the course of the kidnapping or before such person is able to return or be returned to safety
Murder committed in the course of the commission of sexual assault in the first degree
Murder of two or more persons at the same time or in the course of a single transaction
Murder of a person under 16 years of age.

Executions

During the 366 years between 1639 and 2005, Connecticut has performed a total of 126 executions. This averages to be approximately one execution every three years. The only person to be executed since 1960 has been the serial killer and rapist Michael Bruce Ross on May 13, 2005, for the kidnapping, rapes and murders of Robin Stavinsky, April Brunais, Wendy Baribeault, and Leslie Shelley.

Notable executions

Several notable executions have occurred in both Connecticut Colony and in the state of Connecticut, as indicated below.

 Hannah Ocuish – Ocuish, a 12-year-old girl was hanged for first-degree murder despite her age and intellectual disability.
 Gerald Chapman — Chapman, a Prohibition-era gangster known as "The Count of Gramercy Park", was the first criminal to be dubbed "Public Enemy Number One" by the press. Convicted of the October 12, 1924 murder of police officer James Skelly in New Britain, Chapman was executed by upright jerker on April 6, 1926 at the state prison in Wethersfield.
 Serial killer Michael Bruce Ross — The execution of Ross in 2005 was the first and last in Connecticut (and in all of New England) since 1960. It was also the only execution administered by lethal injection in Connecticut and New England. Ross was convicted of murdering eight girls and women between 1981 and 1984 and raping seven of them.

Death row
The male death row was located at the Northern Correctional Institution. In 1995 the male death row moved from Osborn Correctional Institution to Northern. The execution chamber was located at Osborn. The York Correctional Institution housed all female prisoners in the state, but no women were on death row.

See also

 List of people executed in Connecticut
 Cheshire, Connecticut, home invasion murders
 Crime in Connecticut
 Law of Connecticut

References

External links
Executions in Connecticut Since 1894
Legislation and History of Capital Punishment in Connecticut at the Connecticut State Library.
Summary of Connecticut Death Penalty Laws
Summary of Death Penalty Appeals and Habeas Proceedings
Photographs of Connecticut's Death Row Inmates
Photograph of Connecticut Lethal Injection Table
Department of Correction Directives on Administration of Capital Punishment
Department of Correction Offender Information Search

 
1639 establishments in Connecticut
2012 disestablishments in Connecticut
Connecticut
Connecticut law